The Gibson Marshall Special was built in 1930 for Lilian G. Marshall, a Hawaiian guitar teacher and orchestra leader in Hartford, CT.

The body style is the same shape and size as the Gibson L-00 with a 12-fret neck joint. Unlike most L-00 style guitars built as other brands the Marshall Special has an X-braced top. The bracing is the lightest of any Gibson flat-top guitar ever made. The top of the guitar is painted with a tropical volcano scene. The fingerboard and headstock are covered in pearloid and have geometric designs silkscreened as position markers.  he Marshall Special is considered one of the rarest Gibson-made models with only two known examples in existence. The musician Steve Earle reported that he owns one of these two guitars.

Further reading

References

1930 in music
Products introduced in 1930
Marshall Special